The 1996–97 season are the Esteghlal Football Club's 5th season in the Azadegan League, and their 3rd consecutive season in the top division of Iranian football. They are also competing in the Caspian Cup and Turkmenistan President's Cup, and 52nd year in existence as a football club.

Player
As of 1 September 2018.

Pre-season and friendlies

Sedaghat Cup

Naghsh-e Jahan Cup

Competitions

Overview

Azadegan League

Standings

Hazfi Cup

Round of 32

Round of 16

Quarterfinal

Asian Cup Winners' Cup

Second round

Quarterfinal

Semifinals

Play-off

See also
 1996–97 Azadegan League

References

External links
 RSSSF

1996–97
Esteghlal